Sam Latus (born ) is a former English rugby league footballer who played for Hull Kingston Rovers in the Super League competition.

Latus was assigned the club man of the match award during his début against the Huddersfield Giants in the 2010 for the Hull Kingston Rovers.

References

1989 births
Living people
English rugby league players
Hull Kingston Rovers players
Newcastle Thunder players
Rugby league players from Kingston upon Hull
Rugby league wingers
York City Knights players